Thomas Wren is the name of:

Thomas Wren (footballer) (born 1907), English footballer
Thomas Wren (Nevada politician) (1826–1904), American Republican politician
Tommy Wren (born 1976), American Democratic politician in Arkansas
Thomas Thurston Thomas (born 1948), American science fiction author
Thomas Wren (priest) (1632–1679), Archdeacon of Ely